Alexander Kapp may refer to

 Alexander Kapp (dermatologist and allergist) (born 1955) medical director of the department of dermatology and allergy at the Medical University of Hannover
 Alexander Kapp (German educator and editor), (1799–1869) inventor of the term andragogy